Fred Richardson (18 August 1925 – 28 July 2016) was an English footballer, who played as a centre forward in the Football League for Chelsea, Hartlepool United, Barnsley, West Bromwich Albion and Chester.

His grandson Kenton Richardson is a professional footballer who also played for Hartlepool.

References

1925 births
2016 deaths
People from Spennymoor
Footballers from County Durham
Association football forwards
English footballers
Bishop Auckland F.C. players
Chelsea F.C. players
Hartlepool United F.C. players
Barnsley F.C. players
West Bromwich Albion F.C. players
Chester City F.C. players
South Shields F.C. (1936) players
English Football League players